George John Lynch, Sr. (June 20, 1918 – May 6, 1997) was an American race car driver.

Background
George John Lynch was born in Miles City, Montana to John James Lynch and Violet P.  Enduring a rough childhood that saw his parents divorce, he was reared by his paternal grandmother in Nekoosa, Wisconsin, where Lynch bought a used open-wheel race car for $100 and began racing, even before obtaining his civilian driver's license.

Racing career
Lynch's racing career spanned three decades, from 1935 through 1957. He completed over 300 races, primarily in open-wheel midget and sprint cars on small tracks primarily in the Midwestern United States. Lynch won few of his races but, in his own words, "pushed a lot of guys over the finish line." His aggressive driving style, characterized by bumping slower cars, earned him nicknames such as "Leadfoot Lynch" and "Red Devil."

His racing career was briefly interrupted in 1944 when Lynch enlisted in the United States Army, where he was a member of the American occupation force in Japan. During his tour, he earned his jump wings and joined the 11th Airborne Division. He was honorably discharged in 1946.

The highlight of Lynch's career was his participation in the 1949 Indianapolis 500. He crashed into the wall on the first turn of the second lap and held the record for the shortest completed lap at Indy until 1964. Footage of Lynch's crash, along with other action from that race, was used in the 1949 motion picture The Big Wheel starring Mickey Rooney and Spring Byington.

After a failed attempt to qualify for the 1950 Indianapolis 500, Lynch continued racing in sprint and midget cars throughout the country, eventually bringing him to California. He participated in the 1951 Mexican Road Race  which was chronicled in the movie La Carrera Panamericana. He also participating in the newly formed National Association for Stock Car Auto Racing (now known as NASCAR). Lynch officially retired from auto racing in 1957 after becoming "too careful" during a sprint car race.

Retirement from racing
Lynch spent his remaining years in southern California as an auto mechanic, fisherman, and ambassador of auto racing.

Family life and death
Lynch was married five times and had four children: George Jr., Jeanette (died 1969), Roberta, and Neil. After a long struggle with Alzheimer's disease, Lynch died in Los Angeles on May 7, 1997.

Indy 500 results

Racing Statistics

Lynch's AAA/USAC Champ Car and Formula One Series Statistics (racing-reference.info)

References

1918 births
1997 deaths
Racing drivers from Montana
Indianapolis 500 drivers
People from Miles City, Montana
People from Nekoosa, Wisconsin
Racing drivers from Wisconsin
United States Army personnel of World War II